Genovese Drug Stores was a pharmacy chain with stores in New York City, Long Island, northern New Jersey, Fairfield County, Connecticut, and Hartford County, Connecticut. It was acquired by JCPenney in 1998 and merged into its Eckerd Corporation subsidiary.

Genovese Drug Stores had no connection to the Genovese crime family, one of the "Five Families" of the city's Mafia.

History
Genovese Drug Stores was founded in 1924 by Joseph Genovese in Astoria, Queens when he was 21 years old.

In 1955, Joseph W. Genovese Jr., the son of the founder and the chairman of the board, introduced self‐service in the chain.

By 1978, when the founder died, the chain had 50 locations.

The company opened its first Manhattan location in 1993. That year, it also opened its 100th store.

In January 1998, the company closed 5 stores and cut 11% of its workforce due to declining profitability.

In November 1998, the chain was acquired by JC Penney for $432 million in stock and the assumption of $60 million in debt. At that time, the chain was headquartered in Melville, New York and had 141 stores and 5,000 employees and was still almost entirely owned by the Genovese family.

By 2003, all of the stores were rebranded as Eckerd.

References

Defunct pharmacies of the United States
Health care companies based in New York (state)
Rite Aid